Nikolay Maksimovich Korobov, (stage name: Kolya Korobov; ; born 14 December 2004) is a Russian singer and actor. He is a five-time nominee of the Kinder Muz Awards 2017, a nominee for the RU.TV award and the presenter of the S.T.A.R.S. GIRLS by Alex Vorobyov & Kolya Korobov program on Zhara television.

Early life 
Kolya Korobov was born on 14 December 2004.

Career 
In 2015 he debuted on "До звезды" (Towards the Star Talk Show) after which he received an invitation to conduct the Junior Chart Hit parade on Russian Music Box. In the same year, he released the song "Маленькие боссы" (Little Bosses) featured in a clip that starred Dmitry Kharatyan.

In 2016 Kolya Korobov together with Alexey Vorobyov recorded the song "Ямайка" (Jamaica) with an accompanying video. In 2017 the song was nominated for the award RU.TV in the nomination category of Best Duet. That year, they released a joint song called "Будем танцевать" (We'll Dance).

In 2018, the song "Я попал" (I Got Entangled) was released. Directed by Alexey Vorobyov (iTunes chart in 4th place). That year, the artist released the tracks "I Want To Be the First" and "Найди меня" (Find Me) (iTunes chart in 10th place). The program S.T.A.R.S. GIRLS by Kolya Korobov and Alexey Vorobyov was awarded Best Leader of 2018, by Zhara.

In 2019 the song "Недотрога" (Prude) is released (iTunes chart in 4th place).

References

External links
 Официальная страница Коли Коробова в социальной сети "ВКонтакте»
 
 

2004 births
Living people
Russian child singers
Russian pop singers